The 2013 Antigua Barracuda FC season was the club's third and final season in existence, playing in the USL Pro, which at the time was the third division in the United States soccer pyramid. The regular season began on 6 April 2013 and concluded on 31 August 2013.

During the 2013 season, Antigua Barracuda played all of their matches on the road, thus being a travelling team. The team became the first team in the history of United States soccer leagues to lose every single one of their matches, amassing a record of 0-26-0, scoring 11 goals and conceding 91.

Outside of USL Pro, Antigua Barracuda played in the 2013 CFU Club Championship, being a club based in a CFU-member nation. There, they finished in third place in their group, losing one match and tying another. Barracuda did not participate in the Antigua and Barbuda FA Cup, and did not qualify for the USL Pro Playoffs.

Following the conclusion of the 2013 season, Antigua Barracuda FC folded due to financial difficulties.

Background

Review

Competitions

Preseason

USL Pro

Table

Results summary

Results by round

Match reports

CFU Club Championship

Group table

First round

Statistics

Transfers

Player awards

References 

2013 USL Pro season
Antigua and Barbuda football clubs 2012–13 season
Antigua and Barbuda football clubs 2013–14 season